The Río Álamo, is a stream in the state of Tamaulipas, Mexico, and is a tributary of the Rio Grande. It is impounded by Las Blancas Dam, which was completed in 2001 and diverts water to the Marte Gómez Reservoir on the Rio San Juan, another tributary of the Rio Grande.

The Rio Alamo enters the Rio Grande (Rio Bravo del Norte in Mexico) at Rio Grande river kilometer , about  downriver from Falcon Dam.

See also
 List of rivers of Mexico
 List of tributaries of the Rio Grande
 Urban water management in Monterrey, Mexico

References

Rivers of Tamaulipas
Tributaries of the Rio Grande